Naklo may refer to several places:

Czech Republic
 Náklo, a village in Olomouc District and Region of the Czech Republic.

Germany
 Nakło nad Pianą, Polish name for the town of Anklam, Germany

Poland
 Nakło nad Notecią, a town in Kuyavian-Pomeranian Voivodeship, north-central Poland
 Nakło, Opole Voivodeship (southwest Poland)
 Nakło, Częstochowa County in Silesian Voivodeship (south Poland)
 Nakło, Gliwice County in Silesian Voivodeship (south Poland)
 Nakło, Tarnowskie Góry County in Silesian Voivodeship (south Poland)
 Nakło, Subcarpathian Voivodeship (south-east Poland)

Slovenia
 Naklo, Črnomelj, a village in southeastern Slovenia
 Naklo, Divača, a village in southwestern Slovenia
 Naklo, Naklo, a town in northwestern Slovenia
 Municipality of Naklo, a municipality in northwestern Slovenia
 Kalce–Naklo, a village in eastern Slovenia
 Malo Naklo, a village in northwestern Slovenia